The Battle of El Quilo, fought during the Chilean War of Independence, occurred at el Quilo, on the southern side of the Itata river, on 19 March 1814.

Background

By January 1814, Royalist forces had received reinforcements from the Viceroy of Peru and had taken the Patriot stronghold of Talca in March. This had split the line of communication between the two main Patriot armies, led by Bernardo O'Higgins and Juan Mackenna respectively. Gabino Gaínza, the Royalist commander, sent Manuel Barañao with a vanguard of troops, some 400 strong, across the Itata river to prevent O'Higgins from reuniting his army with Mackenna's, resulting in the battle of el Quilo.

The battle

Barañao's force comprised around 400 men and had been placed in defensive positions on the south side of the Itata river, supported by the main body of Gaínza's men on the other side. O' Higgins instead immediately launched an attack without pausing to assess the situation, relying on his larger force and aggression. Barañao's men did not receive reinforcements from Gaínza during the battle and were forced to retreat from their positions.

Aftermath

Concerned that if he pursued Barañao, the royalist commanders would recombine their forces and defeat him, O'Higgins instead entrenched his existing position and stayed on his bank of the river. In turn, the Royalist forces turned north across the river against the forces of Mackenna, leading to the battle of Membrillar a few days later.

Conflicts in 1814
Battles involving Chile
Battles of the Spanish American wars of independence
Battles of the Chilean War of Independence
Battles of the Patria Vieja Campaign
Battle of El Quilo
Battle of El Quilo
Battle of El Quilo